Abhijit Karambelkar (born 4 June 1991) is an Indian cricketer. He made his first-class debut for Baroda in the 2010–11 Ranji Trophy on 11 January 2011.

References

External links
 

1991 births
Living people
Indian cricketers
Baroda cricketers
People from Vadodara